The 2000 Argentina rugby union tour of Australia and England were two series of matches played by the Argentina national rugby union team . 
The first tour (four match) was held in June, the second (two match) in November.

Matches

in Australia 
Scores and results list Argentina's points tally first.

In England 
Scores and results list Argentina's points tally first.

References

Sources

2000
2000
2000
tour
2000 in Australian rugby union
2000–01 in English rugby union
History of rugby union matches between Argentina and England
History of rugby union matches between Argentina and Australia